John Gavin Nolan (March 15, 1924 – November 17, 1997) was a Catholic bishop who served the Archdiocese for the Military Services.

Biography
Born in Mechanicville, New York, Nolan was ordained a priest on June 11, 1949.

On December 12, 1987, Nolan was appointed titular bishop of Natchesium and auxiliary bishop of the Roman Catholic Archdiocese for the Military Services, USA and was consecrated on January 6, 1988.

References

External links
 Archdiocese for the Military Services, USA, official website
 Archdiocese for the Military Services of the United States. GCatholic.org. Retrieved 2010-08-20.

Episcopal succession

1924 births
1999 deaths
People from Mechanicville, New York
Religious leaders from New York (state)
20th-century American Roman Catholic titular bishops
American military chaplains
Chaplains
Catholics from New York (state)